Evgeniy Sladkov (born December 15, 1983) is a Kazakhstani professional road bicycle racer.

External links 

Kazakhstani male cyclists
1983 births
Living people
Cyclists at the 2010 Asian Games
Asian Games competitors for Kazakhstan